Onuaku is a surname. Notable people with the surname include:

Arinze Onuaku (born 1987), American basketball player
Chinanu Onuaku (born 1996), American basketball player, brother of Arinze